After Midnight is a role-playing game adventure published by TSR in 1990 for the Marvel Super Heroes role-playing game.

Contents
After Midnight is a scenario for the Advanced rules. There's a gang war underway in New York, and both sides are using supervillains (and some of Marvel's monster characters). It's up to the heroes to stop it before it gets out of hand.

Publication history
MLA1 After Midnight was written by Anthony Herring, with a cover by Jeff Butler, and was published by TSR, Inc., in 1990 as a 64-page book and an outer folder.

Reception

Reviews

References

Marvel Comics role-playing game adventures
Role-playing game supplements introduced in 1990